The 2017 West Alabama Tigers football team represented the University of West Alabama in the 2017 NCAA Division II football season. They were led by fourth-year head coach Brett Gilliland. The Tigers played their home games at Tiger Stadium and were members of the Gulf South Conference.

Schedule
West Alabama announced its 2017 football schedule on January 13, 2017. The schedule consists of both five home and six away games in the regular season. The Tigers hosted GSC foes Mississippi College, Shorter, West Florida, and West Georgia and traveled to Delta State, Florida Tech, North Alabama, and Valdosta State

The Tigers only hosted one of the three non-conference games against North Greenville which is independent from a conference and traveled to two games against Lenoir-Rhyne from the South Atlantic Conference and Samford from the Southern Conference.

Rankings

References

West Alabama
West Alabama Tigers football seasons
Gulf South Conference football champion seasons
West Alabama Tigers football